Miron Costin may refer to:

Miron Costin, 17th century Moldavian chronicler

or two villages in Romania named after him:
 Miron Costin, a village in Vlăsinești Commune, Botoşani County  
 Miron Costin, a village in Trifeşti Commune, Neamţ County